FloQast is an accounting software vendor based in Los Angeles, California. Founded in 2013, the company provides close management software for corporate accounting departments to help them improve the way they close the books each month.

Since launching, the company is regularly mentioned by industry publications as one of the best-reviewed employers in the Los Angeles tech community. 

In 2017, the company was named by the Los Angeles Business Journal as one of the best small companies to work at in Los Angeles. A year later, FloQast was recognized as one of the 15 best medium-sized companies to work for in Los Angeles. 

In January 2019, the company ranked #11 on Built In LA's 100 Best Places to Work in Los Angeles.

The company announced the opening of a second office in February 2017, expanding to the Midwest with a new office and team in Columbus, Ohio.

History 

FloQast was founded by CPAs and former corporate accountants Mike Whitmire and Chris Sluty, along with veteran software engineer Cullen Zandstra. Whitmire first conceived the idea for the company during his time at Cornerstone OnDemand where he was a senior accountant. Having experienced firsthand the challenges accounting teams face when closing the books each month — from inefficient procedures to outdated workflows and flawed organizational structures —Whitmire aimed to create a product that would support accounting and finance teams during the hectic financial close process.

After devising the concept, Whitmire recruited Zandstra as Co-founder and CTO. The name FloQast was created with the help of a word generator using a combination of accounting terms and contemporary vernacular words. The two developed a minimum viable product (MVP), and were accepted into the prestigious Amplify.LA accelerator program. Following the company’s initial funding, Whitmire recruited his former Syracuse University classmate, Sluty, to join the team as Co-founder/COO/Head of Customer Success.

In November 2014, the company raised a $1.3 million seed round of funding led by Amplify.LA and Toba Capital, before securing a $6.5 million Series A in early 2016. Following a period of growth in which the company tripled its revenues, FloQast raised a $25 million Series B in June 2017. Six months after the funding, the company relocated to a new 20,000-square-foot office in Sherman Oaks to accommodate a staff that had grown 250 percent in 2017 alone.

In May 2020, Tipalti, the world's leading automation network for payables, establishes new partnership with FloQast, Affise, and Myers-Holum.

Product 

FloQast is a Software as a Service (SaaS) application. The financial close management software works with Microsoft Excel and uses process management, reporting, and collaboration to automate the month-end closing of an organization’s financial books. The product provides accounting teams with checklists and tie-outs linked to Excel workbooks and the client of organizations’ enterprise resources planning (ERP) system to automate reconciliations and, ultimately, shorten the financial close process. In 2019, the company introduced FloQast AutoRec, a tool that relies on artificial intelligence to help automate the reconciliation process.

FloQast operates with cloud document storage systems Box, Google Drive, Dropbox, Microsoft OneDrive, and Egnyte, as well as NetSuite and Sage Intacct financial applications. It is compatible with ERP/General Ledger systems, including Oracle, SAP, Microsoft (Dynamics GP, Dynamics NAV), Sage, Epicor, QuickBooks, Financialforce, and others.

Recognition 

In 2018, the company was recognized for:

 50 Startups to Watch in LA
 #5 on Top 25 in B2B LA Tech
 CFO's Tech Companies to Watch 2018: Major Disruptors

In 2017, the company received multiple Stevie Awards for:

 Gold - Company of the Year, Computer Software (Up to 100 employees)
 Silver - Most Innovative Tech Company of the Year - Computer Services and Software (Up to 100 employees)
 Silver - New Product or Service of the Year, Financial Software

In 2017, the company received an award by G2 Crowd for Best Software for Finance Teams.

In 2016, the company received the following two awards:

 Stevie Award (Silver) - Fastest Growing Private Companies, Technology (Up to 100 employees)
 G2Crowd - High Performer

References 

2013 establishments in California
Software companies based in California
Software companies of the United States